The Dayah Hotel attack occurred on 25 January 2017 when a hotel in the Somali capital city Mogadishu was attacked by al-Shabaab gunmen and car bombs, killing 28 people and injuring 43 others. Taking place shortly after 08:00 on a Wednesday morning, the attack began when a car filled with explosives rammed the gate of the Dayah Hotel, a luxury hotel popular with politicians, and detonated. Immediately after, four armed militants attempted to storm the hotel – however Somali security guards shot the men dead before they reached it. As emergency services and journalists converged on the scene, a second car bomb detonated, causing more casualties.

Radio Andalus, a station with links to Al-Shabaab, reported that "well-armed mujahideen attacked the hotel, and now they are fighting inside the hotel." The attack came shortly before the date of the country's presidential election was due to be announced.

See also
 Makka al-Mukarama hotel attack
 Jazeera Palace Hotel bombing
 June 2016 Mogadishu attacks
 February 2017 Mogadishu bombing
 Asasey Hotel attack

References

2010s in Mogadishu
2017 in Somalia
2017 murders in Somalia
2010s crimes in Mogadishu
21st-century mass murder in Somalia
Al-Shabaab (militant group) attacks in Mogadishu
Attacks on buildings and structures in 2017
Attacks on buildings and structures in Mogadishu 
Attacks on hotels in Africa
Islamic terrorist incidents in 2017
January 2017 crimes in Africa
January 2017 events in Africa
Mass murder in 2017
Mass murder in Mogadishu
Suicide bombings in 2017
Suicide bombings in Mogadishu
Suicide car and truck bombings in Somalia
Terrorist incidents in Somalia in 2017
Terrorist incidents involving vehicular attacks
Vehicular rampage in Africa
Somali Civil War (2009–present)
Building bombings in Somalia
Hotel bombings